Hamunabad (Romanized as Hāmūnābād) is a village in Kuhestan Rural District, Central District, Nain County, Isfahan Province, Iran. At the 2006 census, its population was 9, in 5 families.

References 

Populated places in Nain County